The 1965 Peruvian Primera División, the top category of Peruvian football, was played by 10 teams. The national champion was Alianza Lima. This was the first season to qualify two teams to the Copa Libertadores and the last to only include teams from Lima and Callao.

Format
The season was divided into two stages. In the first stage, each team played the others twice (a double round robin system) for a total of 18 games. Teams received two points for a win and one point for a draw. No points were awarded for a loss. The teams carried their records from the first stage into the second stage. In the second stage, the teams were separated into two groups; an upper-table group and lower-table group. Each group played a further 4 games against the teams in their group. The upper group played for the league title and the lower group played to avoid relegation. The season champion and runner-up qualified for the 1966 Copa Libertadores.

League table

First stage

Final group

Relegation group

External links
Peru 1965 season at RSSSF
Peruvian Football League News 

Peru1
1965 in Peruvian football
Peruvian Primera División seasons